The Nanyang Technological University (NTU) is a national research university in Singapore. It is the second oldest autonomous university in the country and is considered as one of the most prestigious universities in the world by various international metrics. It is usually ranked amongst the world's top 20 institutions of higher learning. NTU is ranked 19th in the world according to the 2023 QS World University Rankings, and has also been ranked 1st globally amongst young universities by the QS World University Rankings since 2015.

The university is organised into several colleges and schools, including the College of Engineering, College of Science, Nanyang Business School, Lee Kong Chian School of Medicine, College of Humanities, Arts and Social Sciences, Graduate College, National Institute of Education, and S. Rajaratnam School of International Studies. NTU is also home to several Research Centres of Excellence such as the Earth Observatory of Singapore and Singapore Centre on Environmental Life Sciences Engineering.

The primary campus grounds are located in the western part of Singapore, along 50 Nanyang Avenue. It also has two other campuses in Singapore's healthcare and start-up districts, Novena and one-north respectively. As a comprehensive and large university, it has 34,384 enrolled students and 7,613 faculty and staff as of 2021.

History

Nanyang University (1955–1980)

In 1955, prior to Singapore's independence from the British, Nanyang University was established south of the current Nanyang Technological University campus, with the centre of the present Yunnan Garden as its heart. Its administration building currently houses the Chinese Heritage Centre, a national monument.

Renaming and merger (1980)
Although NTU occupies the grounds of the former Nanyang University (NU), and has a similar name, it is not a direct continuation of that institution. In 1980, the Government of Singapore merged Nanyang University with the University of Singapore to form the present-day National University of Singapore (NUS).  This was a source of significant discontent amongst NU students and alumni, because NU had been a Chinese-medium university, whereas the newly merged NUS was (and is) an English-medium university.

As NTU subsequently grew into a full university, various efforts were made to have it claim the Nanyang University mantle. In 1996, the alumni rolls of Nanyang University were transferred from NUS to NTU. In 1998, the prominent local calligrapher and poet Pan Shou, who had been the first vice-chancellor of Nanyang University, called for NTU to be renamed Nanyang University, as a way to "quieten the hearts of many" NU alumni. In 2003, this idea received further support from NTU president Su Guaning, during an interview with the Chinese-language paper Lianhe Zaobao. One reason offered for the renaming was that, by the mid-2000s, NTU no longer had a narrow focus on technical subjects, but had become a full university including studies in the humanities.

Nanyang Technological Institute (1981–1991)
In 1980, Nanyang University merged with the University of Singapore to form the current National University of Singapore. In complement, Nanyang Technological Institute (NTI), a tertiary institution affiliated to the National University of Singapore, was formed to take over Nanyang University's campus in 1981.

Nanyang Technological Institute (NTI) was set up on 1 August 1981 with a charter to train three-quarters of Singapore’s engineers. When NTI started in 1982, it had a total student population of 582 in three engineering disciplines – civil and structural, electrical and electronic, and mechanical and production engineering. By 1990, the institute’s undergraduate student population had grown to 6,832. The first two graduate students were admitted in 1986.

Three engineering schools were added, and the School of Accountancy from the National University of Singapore was transferred to NTI in 1987. A school of applied science was also started. In 1990, the government announced that the Institute of Education would be merged with the College of Physical Education to form the National Institute of Education and that it would be part of the new NTU upon its establishment in 1991.

Present form
In 1991, NTI merged with the National Institute of Education (NIE) (founded in 1950) to form the Nanyang Technological University (NTU). The alumni rolls of the former Nanyang University were transferred to NTU in 1996. Historically, Nanyang Technological University admitted students jointly with the affiliated National University of Singapore and charged the same fees. Students made only one application and they would be accepted by either university. This arrangement ended in 2004 as both universities began to distinguish themselves with an end of its official affiliation. Currently, students apply separately to both universities. NTU became autonomous in 2006 and stands as one of the two largest public universities in Singapore today.

NTU is currently a collaborative member of Singapore International Graduate Award for PhD applicants worldwide, which comprises Agency for Science, Technology & Research (A*STAR), the Nanyang Technological University (NTU), the National University of Singapore (NUS) and the Singapore University of Technology and Design (SUTD). 

In 2013, there was a debate over academic freedom in Singapore when Cherian George, an outspoken academic at the Wee Kim Wee School of Communications and a government critic, did not get tenured. Although George had been recommended for tenure by the Wee Kim Wee School, his application was turned down by a university-level committee which included representatives from the Government of Singapore. Despite a petition against the tenure decision by students at the Wee Kim Wee School, George's appeal against the tenure decision was subsequently rejected by the university.

In 2021, some applications for on-campus hostel accommodations in NTU were rejected due to COVID-19 isolation protocols. The university claimed that the rejections were due to a shortage of housing facilities, which at full capacity was still unable to house every applicant, as rooms were oversubscribed. Such rejections resulted in concerns, especially among international students, as it resulted in many returning second-year students enrolled in for 2020 to 2021 not being granted campus accommodation despite the university's much-publicised policy of guaranteeing all incoming students with a minimum of two years of on-campus accommodation. NTU eventually reversed their decision on 2 July 2021, prioritising on-campus accommodations for international students that resided on campus at the time, students under scholarship programmes with guaranteed housing, and all Year 1 and 2 students under the guaranteed hall stay policy.

Campuses

Landscape and architecture
NTU has been listed as one of the World's Most Beautiful Universities, featuring the ADM building in the report.
It has also been listed in "The 10 most beautiful universities in East Asia", featuring the Learning Hub building.
During NTI period between 1981 and 1982, the main campus layout including the building complex, the so-called North Spine, has been designed by Kenzō Tange, world-renowned Japanese architect and 1987 winner of the Pritzker Prize. The North Spine has been officially opened in 1986. The ADM building, featured in "Travel + Lesiure" report, has been designed by a young Singaporean architect Lee Cheng Wee.
 The Learning Hub building, also called the Hive, featured in "Times Higher Education" report, has been designed by a British designer Thomas Heatherwick.

Yunnan Garden Campus
The main campus of Nanyang Technological University is the  Yunnan Garden Campus which is situated adjacent to the town of Jurong West. It is the largest university campus on the island of Singapore, housing Singapore's largest on-campus residence infrastructure including 24 halls of residence for undergraduates and two graduate halls.

The campus grounds were originally donated by the Singapore Hokkien Association to Nanyang University. In 1981, the Nanyang University grounds were granted to the Nanyang Technological Institute, a newly formed English-medium engineering college. With the formation of the NTU through NTI's merger with the National Institute of Education (NIE), the grounds were then presented to the university.

The former Nanyang University administration building was restored into the Chinese Heritage Centre and was gazetted as a national monument in 1998 – now overlooking the Yunnan Garden. As of 2019, the Yunnan Garden is undergoing major renovations that will be completed in 2021. However some of it has been partially opened to the public in early 2020 The Nanyang University Memorial and original Nanyang University Arch were also declared national monuments of Singapore in 1998. The NTU Art & Heritage Museum is an approved public museum under the National Heritage Board’s Approved Museum Scheme; benefactors who donate artworks and artefacts to NTU enjoy double tax deductions. There is a small lake between the Chinese Heritage Centre and Hall of Residence 4 called Nanyang Lake. Only members of NTU Anglers' Club permit holder, the fishing club at NTU, are allowed to fish in this lake.

The campus also served as the Youth Olympic Village for the inaugural Youth Olympic Games in 2010.

Novena Campus 

A third campus, Novena Campus, is situated close to LKCMedicine’s partner teaching hospital, Tan Tock Seng Hospital in downtown Novena for medical teaching and research at the Lee Kong Chian School of Medicine. The new 20-storey Clinical Sciences Building was completed in 2016. The CSB is home to LKCMedicine researchers, with the laboratories interconnected through collaborative spaces.

Undergraduate halls

NTU has 23 Halls of Residence for undergraduates, each with a capacity of between 500 and 659 residents. They accommodate 14,000 local and international students, with every freshman guaranteed a hostel room. All halls are co-ed by floor or wing and offer single and double occupancy rooms. Double rooms are shared by residents of the same gender.
Every hall has communal facilities like lounges, air-conditioned reading rooms, pantries and laundry rooms with washing machines and dryers. Presently, freshmen students will be guaranteed a room for two years.

Transportation 

Transportation to and around NTU is provided by means of campus shuttle buses. The Campus Loop Red and Blue services circle the campus, while the Campus Rider service connects the campus to the Pioneer MRT station.

Colleges and schools

NTU is organised into several colleges and schools, each corresponding to different fields of study. The founding colleges include the College of Engineering, Nanyang Business School, Wee Kim Wee School of Communication and Information, and the National Institute of Education, which have been part of NTU since its inception in 1991.

More recently, NTU has established additional schools for the Biological Sciences (2001), Humanities and Social Sciences (2004), Physical & Mathematical Sciences (2005), S. Rajaratnam School of International Studies (2007), and Art, Design and Media (2009). In 2013, NTU and Imperial College London jointly established a new medical school, the Lee Kong Chian School of Medicine, which is based in the Novena campus along 11 Mandalay Road. In October 2016, the university announced that Humanities and Social Sciences would be expanded into two separate schools, namely the School of Humanities and the School of Social Sciences.

Nanyang Business School
Nanyang Business School (NBS) is the largest business school in Singapore with over 6,800 undergraduates and postgraduates. It is also the No.1 business school in Singapore and 3rd in the Asia-Pacific region according to the Financial Times. For 13 consecutive years since 2004, the Nanyang MBA has been ranked the best in Singapore according to The Economist. NBS has more than 160 professors from more than 20 countries, proficient in 30 languages holding doctorates from the most renowned universities in the world. This makes NBS one of the largest business schools in the world in terms of faculty strength.

NBS also houses the 165-square meter Centre for Applied Financial Education, the largest finance lab in Singapore. The new lab is equipped with 60 dedicated Thomson Reuters Eikon terminals with Datastream, along with 24 Bloomberg terminals that will allow business school students to access all kinds of real-time financial, economic and business news information.

College of Humanities, Arts, and Social Sciences

HASS consists of four schools:

The Wee Kim Wee School of Communication and Information is a school of communication studies and offers courses in Journalism, Broadcast, Advertising, Communication Policy and Information Studies. It originally established in 1992 and it was named after Singapore's former president Wee Kim Wee in 2006.
The School of Art, Design and Media is Singapore's first professional art school and offers an undergraduate programmes in Art, Design, and Media, as well as graduate degrees in arts research. Its building, which features a sloping grassy roof surrounding a central courtyard, is frequently featured in NTU's promotional materials. NTU called for a design competition which drew entries from well-known architects. A young Singaporean architect's design proposal emerged as the winner. ADM is the brainchild of a Singaporean architect, Lee Cheng Wee. About a decade later, he designed the centre-piece of Q-Plex in Shenzhen, China, with similar style.
In 2016, NTU announced that they will be splitting the School of Humanities and Social Sciences to 2 separate colleges: the School of Humanities (SOH) and School of Social Sciences (SSS) – to accommodate the rising intake of students.
The School of Humanities which offers programmes in a wide variety of fields including Chinese, English Literature, History, Linguistics & Multilingual Studies and Philosophy.
The School of Social Sciences which offers Economics, Psychology, Public Policy and Sociology.

College of Engineering

The College of Engineering is NTU's largest subdivision. It has been ranked among the world’s top 5 schools of engineering and technology by QS World University Rankings, and claimed to be the world's largest engineering college, with a student population of more than 10,500 undergraduates and 3,500 graduates. It consists of six schools (Chemical and Biomedical, Civil and Environmental, Computer Science and Engineering, Electrical and Electronic, Materials Science, Mechanical and Aerospace) focused on technology and innovation.

The college offers a rich array of multidisciplinary programmes and specialisations in traditional engineering disciplines and beyond. In addition to the 12 single degree programmes, the college also offers double degrees, double majors and integrated programmes as well as the only aerospace engineering programme in Singapore.

College of Science
Today, the college consists of three schools and is home to about 150 faculty members, 340 research staff, 110 administrative and technical staff, 4,000 undergraduate and 750 graduate students.
The School of Biological Sciences was established in 2002 and offers a variety of programmes in the Biological Sciences and also a unique and innovative "East meets West" double degree programme in Biomedical Sciences and Traditional Chinese Medicine with the Beijing University of Chinese Medicine in China. Students may also pursue a second major in Food Science and Technology, which is in conjunction with Wageningen University in the Netherlands, to gain understanding about food processes with an engineering and industrial point of view.
The School of Physical and Mathematical Sciences was established in 2005 and offers various disciplines in Physics, Chemistry, Mathematics. Students also have the choice of several multidisciplinary programmes such as Chemistry and Biological Chemistry with a second major in Food Science and Technology and/or with optional concentrations in current topics such as Green Chemistry and Nanotechnology, Physics with a second major in Mathematical Sciences and the combined major in Mathematics and Economics.
The Asian School of the Environment is a new interdisciplinary School established in 2015 to focus on Asian environmental challenges, integrating Earth systems, environmental life sciences, ecology, and the social sciences to address key issues of the environment and sustainability. Strong interdisciplinary links between ASE and the Singapore Centre on Environmental Life Sciences Engineering (SCELSE), the Earth Observatory of Singapore (EOS) and the Complexity Institute provide a community for tackling large research questions.

Lee Kong Chian School of Medicine

In 2010, NTU announced the formation of a pro-tem governing board to guide the establishment of the Lee Kong Chian School of Medicine, a collaboration with Imperial College London. The medical college was established in 2013. Prior to its opening in 2013, the school received record donations of S$400 million, including S$150 million from the Lee Foundation. The School’s primary clinical partner is the National Healthcare Group.

Graduate College 
NTU's Graduate College was formed on 1 August 2018 and is in charge of graduate programmes in NTU. One such graduate programme is the Interdisciplinary Graduate Programme (IGP), which leverages on professors from multiple schools or colleges in NTU to undertake interdisciplinary research and to act as advisors for IGP PhD students. Another graduate programme is the Industrial Postgraduate Programme (IPP), which leverages on partnering industry companies to undertake industrial research and to act as advisors for IPP PhD students.

National Institute of Education

The National Institute of Education (NIE), occupying  in the western part of NTU's Yunnan Garden campus, is Singapore's main teaching college and is run in close collaboration with Singapore's Ministry of Education. Full-time teachers in Singapore's public schools are required to complete a post-graduate diploma course at NIE, sponsored by Singapore's Ministry of Education. NIE is also internationally acclaimed and provides educational consultancy to countries from Indonesia to UAE.

S. Rajaratnam School of International Studies

The S. Rajaratnam School of International Studies (RSIS), named after Singapore's former Deputy Prime Minister and Minister for Foreign Affairs, offers graduate programmes in international relations and is an autonomous graduate institution of NTU. The school has the Institute of Defence and Strategic Studies—long recognised as a world authority on strategic studies and terrorism. RSIS was ranked second among university-affiliated think tanks in Asia in the 2011 Global Go-To Think Tank Rankings.

Research institutes and centres
NTU hosts three Research Centres of Excellence (RCE).

The Singapore Centre on Environmental Life Sciences Engineering (SCELSE) is a unique interdisciplinary Research Centre of Excellence (RCE), funded by National Research Foundation, Singapore Ministry of Education, Nanyang Technological University and National University of Singapore. Hosted by the NTU in partnership with NUS, SCELSE is linking new insights from the Life Sciences with expertise from the emerging technologies in Engineering and Natural Sciences to understand, harness and control microbial biofilm communities. The union of these fields has established a new discipline of Environmental Life Sciences Engineering.
The Earth Observatory of Singapore (EOS) is an autonomous research institute specialising in Earth Sciences and conducts fundamental research on earthquakes, volcanoes, tsunamis & climate change in and around Southeast Asia, towards safer and more sustainable societies.
The Institute for Digital Molecular Analytics and Science (IDMxS) is an interdisciplinary RCE, funded by Singapore Ministry of Education, Nanyang Technological University and National University of Singapore. IDMxS taps on the new science of digital molecular analytics to drive a paradigm shift in biomolecular measurement and diagnostics, and transform global health.

Clubs and communities

Currently, there are more than 100 student organisations in NTU. These include Constituent Clubs, Non-Constituent Clubs, Academic Clubs, Cultural Club, Welfare Society, Sports Club, Arts Club and clubs for various religion and interests. Many students also take part in sports, recreational games and performing arts activities within the residential hall communities.

University rankings

QS World University Rankings

NTU was ranked 11th in the world and 3rd in Asia in the 2020 QS World University Rankings. NTU also came in overall 1st in the world in the ranking of young universities for five consecutive years in the QS Top 50 Under 50 rankings from 2015 to 2019. In 2011, NTU became the first university in Asia to receive the maximum five stars under the QS Stars evaluation system, and the only one in Singapore to date.

QS World University Rankings by Broad Subject Area and Specific Subject

In 2017, NTU's Engineering and Technology was ranked 4th in the world and 1st in Asia by the QS World University Rankings by Broad Subject Area – Engineering and Technology 2017. NTU also has a research citation that is among the top four in the world, with its research output being ranked among the top three universities globally in Engineering by Essential Science Indicators of Thomson Reuters. In the 2017 QS World University Rankings by Broad Subject Area, NTU is ranked 22nd in the world for Social Sciences and Management for three consecutive years. Social Sciences and Management includes the Wee Kim Wee School of Communication and Information, National Institute of Education, Nanyang Business School and School of Social Sciences. In the field of Natural Sciences, NTU's College of Science is ranked 17th in the world, a drop of 2 places from the previous year, while Arts & Humanities (consisting of the School of Humanities and School of Art, Design and Media) is ranked 51st globally, a drop of 6 places from the previous year.

In the 2017 QS World University Rankings by subjects published, NTU had 19 subjects in the world's top 50, with two subjects in the global top 10. It also came in first in Asia for Materials Science and Electronic Engineering.

Times Higher Education World University Rankings

NTU is ranked 4th in Asia in the Times Higher Education Asia University Rankings 2017, a drop of 2 places from the previous year. In 2017, NTU rose to 52nd position worldwide in the Times Higher Education World University Rankings with strong scores in all the categories measured, particularly for research, citations, international outlook as well as industry income and innovation. As a result, NTU rocketed a total of 122 places since 2011 in the THE rankings. NTU is also ranked 3rd best among the global young universities under 50 years old, a drop of 1 place from the previous year.

Academic Ranking of World Universities and other rankings

Independently, the 2017 Academic Ranking of World Universities published by the Shanghai Ranking Consultancy that ranks universities' research performance and places a high weightage on the number of Nobel Prizes and Fields Medals won by a university’s alumni and faculty placed NTU 115th worldwide and 2nd in Singapore. NTU president Bertil Andersson had voiced out in 2015 that the ARWU ranking methodology is inherently biased against young universities like NTU. Nevertheless, in the same ranking, ARWU places NTU's engineering faculty at No.2 in the world.

NTU's Nanyang Business School is Singapore's top business school, having ranked 24th worldwide in the 2017 Financial Times Global MBA Rankings. For the 13th straight year, Nanyang Business School has been ranked the best in Singapore by The Economist. Also, NBS is placed 10th worldwide in the Financial Times' (FT) rankings of the world’s top 100 Executive MBA (EMBA) programmes. Accounting research at NBS is rated 7th in the world and remained No. 1 in Asia by the Brigham Young University (BYU) Accounting Research Rankings released in April 2014. NTU Tan Hun Tong is currently the world's top accounting researcher for the third year running while Clive Lennox is ranked 7th in the world and 2nd in Asia. Notably, Vijay Sethi was voted the world's best business professor as the sole recipient of the prestigious Business Professor of the Year award from The Economist Intelligence Unit (EIU) in March 2013, beating top business professors from Harvard Business School, Wharton Business School and London Business School.

The S. Rajaratnam School of International Studies has been ranked second among university-affiliated think-tanks in Asia and 22nd internationally.

The Aggregate Ranking of Top Universities (ARTU), which sorts universities based on their aggregate performance across THE, QS, and ARWU, ranked NTU 37th worldwide in 2022.

Notable alumni

Politics, government and public service

International
 Major Agus Harimurti Yudhoyono – Indonesian National Armed Forces, Chief of Operations in Kostrad, son of Susilo Bambang Yudhoyono
Thet Thet Khine – Union Minister of Ministry of Social Welfare, Relief and Resettlement of Myanmar.
 Gen. Tito Karnavian – Indonesian National Police, former Head of Detachment 88, elite anti terror group in Indonesian police, former head of Jakarta Regional Police Division, now head of Indonesian National Police.

Singapore

Current Members of Parliament (MP)
 Masagos Zulkifli – Minister for Social and Family Development, and Member of Parliament for Tampines GRC 
 Low Yen Ling – Parliamentary Secretary, and Member of Parliament for Chua Chu Kang GRC
 Sim Ann – Minister of State, and Member of Parliament for Holland-Bukit Timah GRC
 Zaqy Mohamad – Senior Minister of State, and Member of Parliament for Marsiling-Yew Tee GRC
 Melvin Yong – Member of Parliament for Radin Mas SMC, and Assistant Secretary General National Trades Union Congress
 Cheryl Chan – Member of Parliament for East Coast GRC
 Yip Hon Weng – Member of Parliament for Yio Chu Kang SMC
 Wan Rizal Wan Zakariah – Member of Parliament for Jalan Besar GRC
 Ng Ling Ling – Member of Parliament for Ang Mo Kio GRC, former Managing Director of Community Chest, and 2018 Her World Woman of the Year
 Darryl David – Member of Parliament for Ang Mo Kio GRC
 Derrick Goh – Member of Parliament for Nee Soon GRC
 Ang Wei Neng – Member of Parliament for West Coast GRC
 Desmond Tan Kok Ming – Member of Parliament for Pasir Ris-Punggol GRC
 Gerald Giam Yean Song – Member of Parliament for Aljunied GRC

Retired politicians
 Ang Mong Seng – former Member of Parliament for Bukit Gombak SMC
 Intan Azura Mokhtar – former Member of Parliament for Ang Mo Kio GRC
 Lee Bee Wah – former Member of Parliament for Nee Soon GRC
 Inderjit Singh – former Member of Parliament for Ang Mo Kio GRC
 Teo Ser Luck – former Member of Parliament for Pasir Ris-Punggol GRC, Mayor, and Minister of State
 Yu-Foo Yee Shoon – former Member of Parliament for Yuhua SMC, and Minister of State
 R Sinnakaruppan – former Member of Parliamennt, and first Students' Union President
 Yee Jenn Jong – former Non-Constituency Member of Parliament
 Cheo Chai Chen – former Member of Parliament for Nee Soon Central SMC
 Sebastian Teo Kway Huang – former President of the National Solidarity Party

Business and technology
 Tan Chin Hwee – CEO of Trafigura
 Chade-Meng Tan – Jolly Good Fellow, Google Inc

Academia and research
Shirley Meng – Professor of NanoEngineering at University of California, San Diego and two-time laureate of the Blavatnik Awards for Young Scientists
Yew-Kwang Ng – Albert Winsemius Professor of Economics at NTU and Emeritus Professor in Department of Economics, Monash University
Anthony Fok – Economics “Super Tutor” and President of the Association of Tutors (Singapore); featured on The Straits Times, MediaCorp, BBC and CNBC, renowned tutor and author earning more than $1 million a year

Arts and humanities
 Ho Ho Ying – Abstract artist.
 Liang Wern Fook – Composer, poet and essayist.
 Sarah Choo Jing – Multidisciplinary fine artist.
 Zihan Loo – film director, actor, dancer.
 Quek See Ling – Poet, writer, Chinese ink painter and editor.

Media and entertainment

Sports
 C Kunalan – Former National Sportsman, and Educator at the National Institute of Education
 Calvin Kang Li Loong – National Sprinter
 Lee Wung Yew – Multiple SEA Games gold medallist in shooting.
 Shalom Danielle See - Singapore National Schools U-19 400m record holder 2008

Notable faculty

Medicine, science and engineering
 Bertil Andersson – Biochemistry
 Freddy Boey – Materials Engineering
 Balazs Gulyas – Neuroscience
 Philip Ingham – Zebrafish models for Human diseases
 Daniela Rhodes – Structural and Molecular Biology
 Kerry Sieh – Geology and Seismology
 Rudolph A. Marcus – Nobel Laureate in Chemistry 1992
George James Augustine –  Irene Tan Liang Kheng Chair Professor in Neuroscience

Humanities and social sciences
 Li Chenyang - Philosophy academic and researcher, specialist in Confucian ethics
 Winnie Sung - Philosophy
 Leonard Kwok - Logic
 Grace Chia – Literature
 Liang Wern Fook – Chinese Studies, Mandopop singer-songwriter, Xinyao pioneer
 Nadia Magnenat Thalmann – Computer graphics

Business and technology
 Vijay Sethi – First Economist Intelligence Unit Business Professor of the Year

Wee Kim Wee School of Communication and Information
 Richard Ling (ret.) – Social consequences of mobile communication

References

External links

 
ASEAN University Network
Autonomous Universities in Singapore
Educational institutions established in 1991
Education in Singapore
1991 establishments in Singapore